Jhonatha de Campos Seraphim (born February 4, 1995, São Paulo, Brazil) is a Brazilian professional footballer who plays for C.D. Tepatitlán de Morelos.

References

External links
 

1995 births
Living people
Brazilian footballers
Brazilian expatriate footballers
Association football forwards
Coras de Nayarit F.C. footballers
C.D. Tepatitlán de Morelos players
Ascenso MX players
Liga Premier de México players
Brazilian expatriate sportspeople in Mexico
Expatriate footballers in Mexico
Footballers from São Paulo